Terna Nande (born June 17, 1983) is a former American football linebacker. He was drafted by the Tennessee Titans in the fifth round of the 2006 NFL Draft after becoming the first and only non-lineman in NFL history to bench press over 40 reps at the NFL Combine. He played college football at Miami University.

Nande was also a member of the Indianapolis Colts and San Diego Chargers of the NFL and the BC Lions of the Canadian Football League

Nande's parents, David and Veronica, came to the United States from Nigeria to pursue an education.

References

External links
BC Lions bio
Miami RedHawks bio
Tennessee Titans bio

1983 births
Living people
Sportspeople from Grand Rapids, Michigan
Players of American football from Grand Rapids, Michigan
American football linebackers
American players of Canadian football
Canadian football linebackers
Miami RedHawks football players
Players of American football from Michigan
Tennessee Titans players
Indianapolis Colts players
San Diego Chargers players
BC Lions players
American sportspeople of Nigerian descent